Raghunandan Sharma (born 7 April 1946 Sujaanpura, Mandsaur district) is a member of the Rajya Sabha from the Madhya Pradesh state of India. He is a leader of Bharatiya Janata Party.

Personal life and Education
Sharma was born on 7 April 1946 in the village of Sujaanpara in Mandsaur district, Madhya Pradesh to Gauri Shankar Sharma and Ram Sukhi Bai. He got his Master of Arts degree in Political Science at Vikram University, Ujjain.

He married Shanti Devi Sharma in 1966 and has two sons.

Positions held
Sharma has held the following positions during his career as a legislator.
 1977-1980 - Member, Madhya Pradesh Legislative Assembly 
 April 2008 - Elected to Rajya Sabha 
 May 2008 - May 2009 - Member, Committee on Chemicals and Fertilizers
 Aug. 2009 onwards - Member, Committee on Chemicals and Fertilizers 
 May 2012 onwards - Committee on Official Language 
 May 2008- Sept. 2009 - Member, Committee on Subordinate Legislation 
 Aug. 2009 onwards - Member, Consultative Committee for the Ministry of Food Processing Industries 
 May 2012 onwards - Member, Committee on Official Language 
 Aug. 2012 onwards - Member, Committee on Chemicals and Fertilizers

Current Position
 July 2014 onwards - Honorary Advisor to the Bureau of Parliamentary Studies and Training (BPST), a wing of the Lok Sabha

References 

Rajya Sabha members from Madhya Pradesh
Madhya Pradesh MLAs 1977–1980
People from Mandsaur district
Vikram University alumni
1946 births
Living people
Bharatiya Janata Party politicians from Madhya Pradesh